VTR (Vía Trans Radio Comunicaciones SpA) is a Chilean telecommunications company. It is the country's largest provider of subscription television, with 1,065,675 subscribers (32.8% market share, as of September 2017), and of fixed broadband Internet access (38.0% share, as of September 2017). It is also the second largest provider of fixed telephone service (20.0%, as of September 2017), behind Telefónica. It also has a small but growing participation (0.90%, as of September 2017) in the mobile phone business.

It is wholly owned by Liberty Latin America following the split of Liberty Latin America from Liberty Global effective December 29, 2017; Grupo Saieh's CorpGroup previously owned 20% until March 2014 when Liberty Global acquired the remaining 20% it did not own.

VTR also owned Bazuca.com, a now-defunct video rental services company, and —together with Turner Broadcasting System— CNN Chile, a 24-hour news channel based in Santiago, until 2016, when it was bought entirely by WarnerMedia Latin America.

References

External links
 

Telecommunications companies of Chile
Internet service providers
Cable television companies
Liberty Global
Companies based in Santiago
Telecommunications companies established in 1928
Chilean companies established in 1928